The Prime Minister of Moldova is Moldova's head of government. The prime minister is formally appointed by the president of Moldova and exercises executive power along with the cabinet, subject to parliamentary support. Dorin Recean has been serving as prime minister since 16 February 2023 following the dissolution of the Gavrilița cabinet.

List of prime ministers of Moldova

Moldavian Democratic Republic (1917–1918) 
 Pantelimon Erhan (7/20 December 1917–13/26 January 1918)
 Daniel Ciugureanu (16/29 January 1918–8/21 April 1918)
 Petru Cazacu (9/22 April 1918–29 November/12 December 1918)

Moldavian Soviet Socialist Republic (1940–1991)

Chairmen of the Council of People's Commissars 

 Tihon Konstantinov (2 August 1940 – 17 April 1945), 
 Nicolae Coval (17 April 1945 – 4 January 1946)
 Gherasim Rudi (5 January–4 April 1946)

Chairmen of the Council of Ministers 

 Gherasim Rudi (4 April 1946 – 23 January 1958)
 Alexandru Diordiță (23 January 1958 – 15 April 1970)
 Petru Pascari (24 April 1970 – 1 August 1976) (1st time)
 Semion Grossu (1 August 1976 – 30 December 1980)
 Ion Ustian (30 December 1980 – 24 December 1985)
 Ivan Călin (24 December 1985 – 10 January 1990)
 Petru Pascari (10 January–26 May 1990) (2nd time)
 Mircea Druc (26 May 1990 – 22 May 1991)

Republic of Moldova (1991–present) 

 Parties

 Status

References

See also 

 Cabinet of Moldova
 President of Moldova

 

 
Moldova, prime minister
Lists of Moldovan politicians
1991 establishments in Moldova